Saeedi Garden (Romanized as Bāgh-e-Saeedi) is a historical garden with an area of 4 hectares located in Nishapur, Iran.

The garden was built in the late Qajar dynasty and early Pahlavi period.

References

Nishapur